Fifteen is the fifth full-length album from Canadian folk trio The Wailin' Jennys. The nine-song album of covers commemorates the trio's fifteen years as a recording entity. The songs are a combination of ones played during their concerts and those decided during the five–day recording session.

Track listing

Personnel
Ruth Moody – vocals, banjo, guitar
Heather Masse – vocals
Nicky Mehta – vocals, guitar
Sam Howard – upright bass
Richard Moody – viola, violin, mandolin
Adam Dobres – acoustic and electric guitars, mandolin
Adrian Dolan – violin

Charts

References

2017 albums
The Wailin' Jennys albums
Red House Records albums
Covers albums